Boguski (feminine: Boguska; plural: Boguscy) is a Polish surname. Notable people with this surname include:

 Józef Boguski (1853–1933), Polish chemist
 Mark Boguski (died 2021), American pathologist
 Rafał Boguski (born 1984), Polish footballer

See also
 

Polish-language surnames